Jean-Pierre Jouannaud is a French computer scientist, known for his work in the area of term rewriting.

He was born on 21 May 1947 in Aix-les-Bains (France).
From 1967 to 1969 he visited the Ecole Polytechnique (Paris).
In 1970, 1972, and 1977, he wrote his Master thesis (DEA), PhD thesis (Thèse de 3ème cycle), and Habilitation thesis (Thèse d'état), respectively, at the Université de Paris VI.
In 1979, he became an associate professor at the Nancy University; 1985 he changed to the Université de Paris-Sud, where he became a full professor in 1986.

He was member of the steering committee of several international computer science conferences: International Conference on Rewriting Techniques and Applications (RTA) 1989-1994, IEEE Symposium on Logic in Computer Science (LICS) 1993-1997, Conference for Computer Science Logic (CSL) 1993-1997, International Conference on Principles and Practice of Constraint Programming (CP) since 1994, and Federated Logic Conference (FLoC) 1995-1999.
Since 1997, he is member of the EATCS council.

Selected publications

References

External links
 Home page at Laboratoire d'Informatique (LIX), École Polytechnique, Palaiseau
 

French computer scientists
Rewriting systems
Theoretical computer scientists
1947 births
École Polytechnique alumni
Living people